Chi-Lites is the self-titled sixth studio album by American soul group The Chi-Lites, produced and largely written by, lead singer Eugene Record.  The album was released in 1973 on the Brunswick label.

History
Chi-Lites includes three of the group's most successful singles.  "Stoned Out of My Mind" and "Homely Girl" both made the top 3 on the US R&B chart, while "Homely Girl" and "Too Good to Be Forgotten" both making the top 10 hit list in the UK.  The latter, while never released as a single in the US, has remained one of the group's biggest hits in the UK. In 1986, there was a cover version by the band Amazulu, which also made the top 10.  Chi-Lites peaked at #3 on the R&B chart and #89 on the Pop chart.

Track listing

Charts

Singles

References

External links
Chi-Lites at Discogs

1973 albums
The Chi-Lites albums
Brunswick Records albums
Albums produced by Eugene Record